Kerimov is a surname. The female is Kerimova. Notable people with the surname include:

 Aslan Kerimov (born 1973), Azerbaijani footballer
 Kenan Kerimov (born 1976), Azerbaijani footballer and football manager and former player
 Kerim Kerimov (1917–2003) Soviet Azerbaijani engineer, regarded as one of the key scientists and founders in the Soviet Union's space program
 Ramiz Kerimov (born 1981), Azerbaijani footballer 
 Suleyman Kerimov (born c. 1966), Russian billionaire businessman, philanthropist and politician of Lezgian origin, Russian politician and businessman

See also
Karimov
Kerimova